Mohammed Omar Hashim Ali Said (born 27 January 1983) is Qatari former professional footballer who played as a midfielder. He played for the Qatar national team between 2006 and 2011.

References

External links
 Profile at Qatar SC
 Mohammed Omar at Qatar Stars League

1983 births
Living people
Qatari footballers
Association football midfielders
Qatar SC players
Al-Shamal SC players
Qatar Stars League players
Qatari Second Division players
Qatar international footballers